Alan Beverley Cross (13 April 1931 – 20 March 1998) was an English playwright, librettist, and screenwriter.

Early life
Born in London into a theatrical family, and educated at the Nautical College Pangbourne, Cross started off by writing children's plays in the 1950s. He achieved instant success with his first play, One More River, which dealt with a mutiny in which a crew puts its first officer on trial for manslaughter. The play premiered in 1958 at the New Shakespeare Theatre Liverpool, starring Robert Shaw, directed by Sam Wanamaker, and in 1959, still with Robert Shaw, directed by Guy Hamilton at the Duke of York's Theatre in London.

Career
Cross' second play, Strip the Willow, was to make a star out of his future wife, Maggie Smith, though the play never received a London production. In 1962, he translated Marc Camoletti's French farce Boeing Boeing, which had a lengthy run in the West End. In 1964, he directed the play in Sydney. Another success was Half a Sixpence, a musical comedy based on the H.G. Wells novel Kipps for which he wrote the book. This opened in 1963, and like his first play, ran in London for more than a year.

He also wrote opera librettos for Richard Rodney Bennett (The Mines of Sulphur, All the King's Men, and Victory) and Nicholas Maw (The Rising of the Moon).

Cross later became well known for his screenplays, including Jason and the Argonauts (1963), The Long Ships (1964), Genghis Khan (1965), and Clash of the Titans (1981). He also adapted Half a Sixpence for the 1967 film version. He also worked uncredited on the script for Lawrence of Arabia (1962), although whether any of his material made it to the final edit is unknown.

Personal life

He was the stepfather of Maggie Smith's children from her earlier marriage, actors Chris Larkin and Toby Stephens. He died in London in 1998 aged 66.

References

External links
 

1931 births
1998 deaths
Place of birth missing
English male screenwriters
English opera librettists
Writers from London
20th-century English dramatists and playwrights
English male dramatists and playwrights
20th-century English male writers
20th-century English screenwriters
People educated at Pangbourne College